Zlatar is a town and municipality in Krapina-Zagorje County in Croatia. In the 2011 census, there were 6,096 inhabitants in the following settlements:

 Belec, population 356
 Borkovec, population 225
 Cetinovec, population 129
 Donja Batina, population 374
 Donja Selnica, population 196
 Ervenik Zlatarski, population 35
 Gornja Batina, population 238
 Gornja Selnica, population 201
 Juranšćina, population 193
 Ladislavec, population 144
 Martinšćina, population 375
 Petruševec, population 135
 Ratkovec, population 105
 Repno, population 231
 Šćrbinec, population 11
 Vižanovec, population 156
 Završje Belečko, population 62
 Znož, population 24
 Zlatar, population 2,906

In the 2011 census, the absolute majority were Croats.

History
In the late 19th and early 20th century, Zlatar was a district capital in Varaždin County of the Kingdom of Croatia-Slavonia.

References

External links
 

Populated places in Krapina-Zagorje County
Varaždin County (former)
Cities and towns in Croatia